Tuanku Pasaman was an Islamic cleric (ulama) and leader. He was known as a prominent padri, a group of Islamic reformists who advocated for the puritanical approach in Islam inspired by Muhammad ibn Abd al-Wahhab in the early 18th century West Sumatra. There is not much data available for this figure, except for his role during the Padri War. 

In 1815, he led padri group and stormed the government office of Pagaruyung Kingdom, toppled the Sultan Arifin Muningsyah who escaped to Lubuk Jambi. In the record of Raffles, who traveled around Pagaruyung in 1818, it is mentioned that Pasaman only looted the handful of remains of the burned-down castle.

See also
Islam in West Sumatra

References

Indonesian Muslims
Minangkabau people
Padris